The IAAF U18 Championships in Athletics (until 2015 known as IAAF World Youth Championships in Athletics) was a global athletics event comprising track and field events for competitors who were 17 or younger (youth = Under-18). The event was organized by International Association of Athletics Federations (IAAF). It was held biennially from 1999 to 2017.

The name change and cancellation
In the 206th IAAF Council Meeting, held after the 2016 Summer Olympics, the council decided to conclude the world championship for under-18 athletes after the 2017 event. The decision was made with the intention of improving under-18 competitions at continental level instead. The competition was renamed to the IAAF World U18 Championships in November 2015, though ultimately only the 2017 competition used this title.

The competition was the under-18 counterpart to the World U20 Championships, which are for athletes who are 19 years of age or under in the year of competition.

Editions

Championships records
Key:

Boys

Girls

All-time medal table
Correct as of 2017 edition

Notes
 Independent Athletes were not included in the official medal table.

See also
Youth (athletics)
World Para Athletics Junior Championships

References

External links
Official IAAF WU18Ch site
Past results from GBR Athletics

 
Under-18 athletics competitions
Recurring sporting events established in 1999
Recurring sporting events disestablished in 2017
U18
World youth sports competitions
Defunct athletics competitions
Biennial athletics competitions
World Youth Championships